Groufie is a 2021 Indian Kannada language suspense thriller film directed by Ravi Arjun. The film starring Aryan SG, Padmashree C Jain, Gagan Gowda, Uma Mayuri, Prajwal Ranesinghe, Sandhya Gowda are in the lead roles. The music for the film is scored by Vijeth Krishna. The cinematography is by Ajaya Laxmikantha and editing is done by Vijeth Chandran. The film is produced by K G Swamy under Lia Global Media production company.

Cast 
Aryan SG as Karthik 
Padmashree C Jain as Bhuvi
Gagan Gowda as Punith 
Uma Mayuri as Poorvi
Prajwal Ranesinghe as Shashank 
Sandhya Gowda as Sanika

References

External links 
 

2021 films
Indian mystery thriller films
2021 thriller films
2020s Kannada-language films